Varan Fala (or Varan Phala), is a traditional Maharashtrian recipe made up of pieces of Wheat flour dough cooked with boiled, mashed, & tempered Toor dal. It is often served with Ghee (Clarified butter) and chopped fresh Coriander leaves. It may be eaten by sprinkling some fresh Lime juice over it or with Dahi (Curd). 

It is similar to Daal Dhokali in Gujarati and Rajasthani Cuisine. 

Maharashtrian cuisine